Kruševo Municipality is a municipality in the central region of North Macedonia. Kruševo is also the name of the town where the municipal seat is found. This municipality is part of the Pelagonia Statistical Region.

Geography
The municipality borders Plasnica Municipality to the northwest, Makedonski Brod Municipality to the north, Dolneni Municipality and Krivogaštani Municipality to the east, Mogila Municipality to the south, and Demir Hisar Municipality and Kičevo Municipality to the west.

Demographics
A large part of the Macedonian population in Kruševo originate from Lazaropole and descend from Mijaks, a Macedonian sub-group who settled in the town alongside the Aromanians by the middle of the nineteenth century. Aromanians settled in Kruševo in addition to Orthodox Albanian refugees often in groups of families and led by a priest fleeing the 18th century socio-political and economic crises in what is now southern Albania. Orthodox Albanians arrived from  Vithkuq and the Opar region while local Kruševo traditions also relate that other families arrived from Korçë and the villages of Polenë, Dardhë, and Mborje. In the early 20th century, Kruševo was a small town in Manastir Vilayet with a mixed population of 4,950 Bulgarians, 4,000 Vlachs (Aromanians) and 400 Christian Albanians, according to Bulgarian geographer Vasil Kanchov's statistics. Due to intermarriage with locals, at the onset of the twentieth century few in the small local Orthodox Albanian community spoke Albanian.

The municipality of Kruševo also contains a Muslim Albanian population living in the region. In the modern era relations between Kruševo Aromanians and Muslim Albanians remain cordial, as do relations of Kruševo's Christian inhabitants with Muslim villagers of the municipality when they arrive into town to conduct business on market day and attend to administrative tasks. In 1996 the creation of Žitoše municipality (now part of Dolneni Municipality) reduced some of Kruševo Municipality's religious and linguistic diversity as the new municipal unit included a sizable number of Muslim Albanians.

According to the last national census from 2021, this municipality has 8,385 inhabitants. Ethnic groups in the municipality include:

Inhabited places

There are 18 inhabited places in this municipality.

Education
Education in the Municipality is organized in 2 elementary schools and 1 high school:

 Elementary School "Nikola Karev"
 Elementary School "Cyril and Methodius"
 High School "Naum Naumovski - Borce"

During the school year 2018/2019, 750 students attended elementary school in the territory of Municipality, of which 366 Albanians, 321 Macedonians, 57 Aromanians and 6 others.

References

External links
 Official website

 
Pelagonia Statistical Region
Municipalities of North Macedonia